Sam Walker (born August 15, 1950) is an American weightlifter. He competed in the men's super heavyweight event at the 1976 Summer Olympics.

References

External links
 

1950 births
Living people
American male weightlifters
Olympic weightlifters of the United States
Weightlifters at the 1976 Summer Olympics
Sportspeople from Dallas
20th-century American people
21st-century American people